Anke is a female given name. It may refer to the following:

Anke Baier-Loef (born 1972), German speed skater
Anke Behmer, née Vater (born 1961), former East German athlete
Anke Borchmann (born 1954), German rower
Anke Brockmann (born 1988), German field hockey player
Anke Dannowski, German mountain bike orienteering competitor
Anke Ehrhardt, researcher into sexual and gender development of children, adolescents, and adults
Anke Engelke (born 1965), German comedian, actress and voice-over actress born in Montréal, Quebec, Canada
Anke Feller (born 1971), retired German sprinter who specializes in the 400 metres
Anke Fuchs (born 1937), German lawyer and politician of the Social Democratic Party of Germany
Anke-Eve Goldmann (born 1930), German former motorcycle journalist
Anke Huber (born 1974), German retired professional tennis player
Anke Kühne née Kühn (born 1981), female field hockey player from Germany
Anke Eißmann (born 1977), German illustrator and graphic designer known for her illustrations of Tolkien's work
Anke Möhring (born 1969), former freestyle swimmer and Olympic medallist from East Germany
Anke Nothnagel (born 1966), East German-German sprint canoeist
Anke Ohde, East German sprint canoeist who competed in the mid-1970s
Anke Pietrangeli (born 1982), South African singer, winner of Idols in South Africa in 2003
Anke Reschwam Schulze (born 1972), German cross country skier
Anke Rijnders (born 1956), former butterfly and freestyle swimmer from the Netherlands
Anke Scholz (born 1978), retired female swimmer from Germany
Anke Spoorendonk (born 1947), Danish-German politician
Anke Van dermeersch (born 1972), Flemish politician and former beauty queen
Anke Vondung (born 1972), German mezzo-soprano
Anke Westendorf (born 1954), German former volleyball player
Anke Wild (born 1967), former field hockey player from Germany
Anke Wischnewski (born 1978), German luger who has competed since 2001

See also
Hannelore Anke (born 1957), German swimmer who competed for East Germany in the 1970s
Anke (TV series), a German television series starring Anke Engelke
Aunk (originally Anke), hamlet in East Devon, England